The 1st TCA Awards were presented by the Television Critics Association. The ceremony was held on June 9, 1985 at The Century Plaza Hotel in Los Angeles, California.

Winners and nominees

Multiple wins 
The following shows received multiple wins:

Multiple nominations 
The following shows received multiple nominations:

References

External links
 Official website 
 1985 TCA Awards at IMDb

1985 television awards
1985 in American television
TCA Awards ceremonies